Lampsilis siliquoidea, also known as the fatmucket, is a species of freshwater bivalve in the family Unionidae.

Description
The shape of the shell is oblong to elliptical, compressed or inflated, with uniform thickness. Fatmucket clams are filter feeders. They feed on algae, phytoplankton, protozoans and organic particles. In the parasitic glochidial stage they feed on blood from hosts species, which include bass, perch, walleye, and sturgeon.

Distribution and habitat
It is widespread in North America, found in the drainages of both the Mississippi River from New York to Minnesota, the Great Lakes, and Hudson Bay. It lives in lakes, rivers, streams and quiet waters, usually on sandy-mud bottoms.

References

 Turgeon, D. D., A. E. Bogan, E. V. Coan, W. K. Emerson, W. G. Lyons, W. Pratt, et al. (1988) Common and scientific names of aquatic invertebrates from the United States and Canada: mollusks, American Fisheries Society Special Publication 16
 Turgeon, D. D., J. F. Quinn, Jr., A. E. Bogan, E. V. Coan, F. G. Hochberg, W. G. Lyons, et al. (1998) Common and scientific names of aquatic invertebrates from the United States and Canada: Mollusks, 2nd ed., American Fisheries Society Special Publication 26

External links
Animal Diversity
Catalogue of Life

siliquoidea